Armitron is a watch brand manufactured by E. Gluck Corporation, headquartered in Little Neck, New York.  It was founded in 1975 by Eugen Gluck. As of 1999, Armitron had the fifth largest share of all watch purchasers, by brand, in the United States.

History 

At the time of Armitron's founding, E. Gluck Corporation (then E. Gluck Trading Company) was a subsidiary of Armin Corporation.  It specialized in LED-powered, five-function (hour, minutes, second, day and date) digital watches. The Armitron brand name is a combination of “Armin” and “electronics”.  Often using cases from Switzerland and bracelets from Hong Kong, Armitron watches were built in a custom-designed factory in Arlington, Texas.

In the late 1970s, E. Gluck Trading Company and Armin Corporation severed ties.  E. Gluck Corporation became a privately held company and retained the Armitron brand.  As watch technology evolved and LED technology became less practical, LCD (liquid crystal display) displays were integrated into Armitron watches.  Combined with Japanese quartz movements, these LCD watches were extremely accurate and durable.  Advanced functionality, such as alarms and chronographs were later incorporated to enhance the benefits of this precise timekeeper.

Through the 1980s, Armitron was widely identified by its connection with various professional sports teams and professional athletes.  Jerry Rice, Boomer Esiason, Darryl Strawberry, Dwight Gooden, Larry Bird and others were endorsers of the brand.  Armitron remains an Official Sponsor of the New York Yankees.

Today, Armitron continues to produce a range of quartz and automatic movement timepieces for men and women.

As of the 2021 season, Armitron is a clock sponsor at Yankee Stadium, and for the original run of American Gladiators.

References

External links 
 

Watch brands
American brands